Grazhdansky Prospekt (literally Civil Prospect)is a station on the Kirovsko-Vyborgskaya Line of the Saint Petersburg Metro. It was designed by architects A. Getskin, V Vydrin and E. Val' and opened on December 29, 1978. The station vestibule is located in the south-western corner of the intersection between Grazhdansky and Prosvesheniya avenues. It was built to serve the then-recent housing developments in the area. Since then, the neighborhoods in its proximity have continued to grow unabated, making it one of the metro's busier stations during rush hours.

References

External links

Saint Petersburg Metro stations
Railway stations in Russia opened in 1978
Railway stations located underground in Russia